Emmanuel Bodjollé (born 1928) is a Togolese former military officer who was Chairman of the nine-member Insurrection Committee that overthrew the government of President Sylvanus Olympio on 13 January 1963.

Biography 
Bodjollé, a former master-sergeant in the French army, had been among a group of around 300 soldiers who on discharge from the French services had not been integrated into the Togolese army. He led a conspiracy of around thirty other former non-commissioned officers, who arrested the ministers of Olympio's government. The coup saw former president Olympio shot dead at the gate of the US embassy compound by Etienne Eyadéma, later known as Gnassingbé Eyadéma, a later president of Togo.

Bodjollé's coup installed Nicolas Grunitzky as Togolese leader.

References

1928 births
Possibly living people
People of French West Africa
Togolese politicians
French military personnel
Togolese military personnel